Žman  is a village on island Dugi Otok, Zadar county in Croatia.

Populated places in Zadar County
Dugi Otok